Rudno is the name of several rural localities in Russia:
Rudno, Leningrad Oblast, a village in Novoselskoye Settlement Municipal Formation of Slantsevsky District of Leningrad Oblast
Rudno, Pskov Oblast, a village in Plyussky District of Pskov Oblast